Sentinel Mountain is a  mountain located in the North Saskatchewan River valley of the Canadian Rockies of Alberta, Canada. Its nearest higher peak is Elliott Peak,  to the southeast. Both can be seen from the David Thompson Highway and Abraham Lake. Precipitation runoff from Sentinel Mountain drains into tributaries of the North Saskatchewan River. The mountain was named in 1893 by Arthur P. Coleman and the toponym was officially adopted in 1928 by the Geographical Names Board of Canada.


Geology

Sentinel Mountain is composed of sedimentary rock laid down from the Precambrian to Jurassic periods. Formed in shallow seas, this sedimentary rock was pushed east and over the top of younger rock during the Laramide orogeny.

Climate

Based on the Köppen climate classification, Sentinel Mountain is located in a subarctic climate zone with cold, snowy winters, and mild summers. Winter temperatures can drop below -20 °C with wind chill factors below -30 °C.

See also
List of mountains of Canada
Geography of Alberta

References

External links
 Weather forecast: Sentinel Mountain

Two-thousanders of Alberta
Canadian Rockies
Alberta's Rockies